Harmonajzer (Harmonizer) is the ninth studio album by the Serbian rock band Električni Orgazam, released by PGP RTS in 2002.

Track listing 
 "Danas nisam sasvim svoj" (2:49)
 "Istina nema kraj" (3:11)
 "Neka sada vide svi" (2:25)
 "Nebo broji korake" (4:26)
 "Ko se sada seća svega" (2:23)
 "Senke zidova" (4:32)
 "Promene" (3:17)
 "РECTOPAH 3 ОPA" (1:43)
 "Zato stojim sam" (4:57)
 "Tome neće doći kraj" (2:54)
 "Protiv sebe" (7:30)
 "Đankarlo Gingiva ponovo jaše" (2:49)
 "Ona šeta psa" (3:12)

Personnel 
 Srđan Gojković Gile (vocals, guitar)
 Zoran Radomirović Švaba (bass)
 Branislav Petrović Banana (guitar, vocals, bass on track 7, lead vocals on 7 and 10, organ on 5 and 9)
 Blagoje Nedeljković Pače (drums)

Additional personnel 
 Dule Petrović (saxophone on tracks 1 and 4)
 Zoran Erkman (trumpet on tracks 1 and 4)
 Boris Bunjac (backing vocals on tracks 2, 3 and 6, percussion on 11)
 Zdenko Kolar (backing vocals on tracks 2, 3 and 6)
 Nemanja Kojić Kojot (trombone on 4)
 Dušan Kojić Koja (rhythm guitar on tracks 7 and 9, acoustic guitar on 8)
 Vlada Divljan (guitar on track 9)
 Ljubomir Djukić Ljuba (lead vocals on track 9)

References 

 EX YU ROCK enciklopedija 1960-2006, Janjatović Petar; 
 Harmonajzer at Discogs

Električni Orgazam albums
2002 albums
PGP-RTS albums